"Dancin' Shoes" is a song written by Carl Storie and performed by Nigel Olsson.  It reached No. 8 on the U.S. adult contemporary chart and No. 18 on the Billboard pop chart in 1979.  The song was featured on his 1979 album, Nigel.

The song was produced by Paul Davis.

The single ranked No. 96 on Billboard's Year-End Hot 100 singles of 1979.

Charts

Weekly charts

Year-end charts

Other versions
Storie's band, Faith Band, released a version of the song as a single in 1978 at the same time as Olsson's that reached No. 54 on the Billboard Hot 100.
Hughie Thomasson released a version of the song on his 1999 album, So Low.

References

1978 songs
1978 singles
Nigel Olsson songs
Mercury Records singles
Bang Records singles